Moussa Ali Hojeij (born 6 August 1974) is a Lebanese football manager and former player who is the head coach of  club Safa.

Hojeij was the best player in the Al-Manar Football Festival several times, and was captain of the national team. He is also a match analyst for Lebanese national team matches on beIN Sports.

Club career 
Hojeij joined Nejmeh's youth team on 26 February 1993. In 2000, Hojeij became the first captain to win the Lebanese Premier League title for Nejmeh after the civil war.

In 2006 he was released by Nejmeh after scoring a total of 75 league goals, and signed with Mabarra. In 2008 Hojeij signed for Lebanese Second Division club Khoyol, and in the summer of 2009 he signed with Shabab Sahel. Hojeij returned to Nejmeh in 2011, retiring in 2013.

International career 
Hojeij equalised in the 76th minute against Iraq at the 2000 AFC Asian Cup through a free kick, to bring the score to 2–2.

Managerial career

Early career 
Hojeij began his managerial career in 2012, as a player-coach for Nejmeh. He became head coach of Nabi Chit in 2014, who terminated his contract after matchday four. Hojeij was then appointed head coach of Racing Beirut in the second half of the season, saving them from relegation.

In the 2015–16 season, he took charge of Shabab Sahel, before returning to Racing the following season, with whom he won the Lebanese Challenge Cup.

Ahed 
In 2017, Ahed appointed Hojeij as head coach; he most notably helped them beat Zamalek of Egypt in the 2017 Arab Club Championship, and winning the Lebanese Super Cup against Ansar. On 18 December 2017, Hojeij was appointed head coach of Tripoli for the second leg of the season, finishing in eighth place after six wins, seven draws and nine defeats.

Returns to Nejmeh 
Hojeij returned as head coach of Nejmeh in 2018. On 29 June 2020, Hojeij was appointed manager of Nejmeh for the third time, after having coached them between 2011 and 2013, and in 2018.

He returned to the helm of Nejmeh once again, in February 2022. After insulting the Lebanese Football Association (LFA) and its president, following a red card received by Nejmeh during a league match against Safa on 3 April, the LFA suspended Hojeij for one year, and fined him £L25 million. The LFA extended the suspension to two years on 11 April.

Safa 
On 9 January 2023, Hojeij was appointed head coach of Safa.

Presidential career 
On 10 June 2021, Hojeij announced his candidacy to become president of the Lebanese Football Association; the only other candidate was incumbent president Hashem Haidar. The elections took place on 29 June in Beirut, with Haidar winning by 40 votes to 4.

Honours

Player 
Nejmeh
 Lebanese Premier League: 1999–00, 2001–02, 2003–04, 2004–05
 Lebanese FA Cup: 1996–97, 1997–98, 2011–12
 Lebanese Elite Cup: 1996, 1998, 2001, 2002, 2003, 2004, 2005
 Lebanese Super Cup: 2000, 2002, 2004
 AFC Cup runner-up: 2005

Mabarra
 Lebanese FA Cup: 2007–08

Individual
 IFFHS All-time Lebanon Men's Dream Team
 Lebanese Premier League Best Player: 1999–2000, 2001–02
 Lebanese Premier League Fans' Best Player: 1998–99, 2000–01, 2002–03
 Lebanese Premier League Best Goal: 2002–03
 Lebanese Premier League Team of the Season: 1996–97, 1997–98, 1998–99, 1999–2000, 2000–01, 2001–02, 2002–03, 2003–04, 2004–05

Manager 
Shabab Sahel
 Lebanese Challenge Cup: 2015

Racing Beirut
 Lebanese Challenge Cup: 2016

Nejmeh
 Lebanese FA Cup runner-up: 2020–21

Individual
 Lebanese Premier League Best Coach: 2011–12

See also
 List of Lebanon international footballers

References

External links

 
 
 
 
 

1974 births
Living people
Footballers from Beirut
Lebanese footballers
Association football midfielders
Nejmeh SC players
Al Mabarra Club players
Al Khoyol FC players
Shabab Al Sahel FC players
Lebanese Premier League players
Lebanese Second Division players
Lebanon international footballers
Asian Games competitors for Lebanon
Footballers at the 1998 Asian Games
2000 AFC Asian Cup players
Lebanese football managers
Association football coaches
Nejmeh SC managers
Al Nabi Chit SC managers
Racing Club Beirut managers
Shabab Al Sahel FC managers
Al Ahed FC managers
AC Tripoli managers
Safa SC managers
Lebanese Premier League managers